Alain Sutter (born 22 January 1968) is a Swiss former professional footballer who played as a midfielder. He is currently the sporting director of FC St. Gallen.

Playing career
Born in Bern, Sutter played youth football for SC Bümpliz 78, before beginning his professional career in 1985 with Grasshoppers, one of Switzerland's most storied clubs. After spending the 1987–88 season on loan at BSC Young Boys, he was ready to take his place in the Grasshoppers first team, where he remained until the 1993–94 season, when he decided to move to Germany to play with 1. FC Nürnberg.

After Sutter's impressive performances during the 1994 FIFA World Cup, Germany's most successful club, Bayern Munich, quickly signed the midfielder where he played for one season, before moving again this time to SC Freiburg. In 1997, he transferred to Major League Soccer in the United States, where he signed for the Dallas Burn (now FC Dallas). He played one season in Dallas but his tenure there was cut short when, during training in early 1998, he stepped awkwardly in a hole of the practice field (the Burn was using the facilities of a high school at that time) and the injury forced him to retire. He ended his career with 68 caps and five goals for the Swiss national team.

Retirement
Sutter was a football expert and commentator for Swiss television from 1998 to 2017.

He became the sporting director of FC St. Gallen on 3 January 2018.

Controversies
Sutter was the main force behind a controversy in 1995. Before an important match for the Swiss team, he unfolded a banner to protest against France testing the atom bomb.

Honours
Grasshoppers
 Swiss Championship: 1989–90, 1990–91
 Swiss Cup: 1988–89, 1989–90
 Swiss Super Cup: 1989

Bayern Munich
 UEFA Cup: 1995–96

Published works

References

External links
 
 

1968 births
Living people
Swiss-French people
Footballers from Bern
Swiss men's footballers
Association football midfielders
Switzerland international footballers
1994 FIFA World Cup players
UEFA Cup winning players
Major League Soccer All-Stars
1. FC Nürnberg players
FC Bayern Munich footballers
SC Freiburg players
FC Dallas players
Grasshopper Club Zürich players
BSC Young Boys players
Swiss Super League players
Bundesliga players
Major League Soccer players
Swiss expatriate footballers
Swiss expatriate sportspeople in Germany
Expatriate footballers in Germany
Swiss expatriate sportspeople in the United States
Expatriate soccer players in the United States